The General Maister Monument is a bronze equestrian statue of Rudolf Maister that stands in a park at Liberation Front Square in front of the Ljubljana railway station. It was created in 1999 by Jakov Brdar as a tribute of the City of Ljubljana to Maister, the first Slovene major general, who secured for Slovenia the city of Maribor.

References

Monuments and memorials in Ljubljana
Center District, Ljubljana
1999 sculptures
Equestrian statues
Cultural depictions of military officers
Cultural depictions of activists